Jeffrey Fluhr is an American business executive, currently a general partner of Craft. He co-founded StubHub and served as its CEO from 2000 until 2007, when it was acquired by eBay. He also established social video platform Spreecast in 2012, which has since ceased operations. As an angel investor he has invested in technology companies such as Houzz, Twilio, Warby Parker and Zocdoc.

Background and early career
Fluhr was born into a business-oriented family; his grandfather, Michael Kosof, owned a women's clothing store in Manhattan which he passed on to Fluhr's mother. His father was an engineering executive at AT&T. Fluhr caught the entrepreneurial spirit as a boy, buying candy in large boxes from a wholesale  distributor, and making a profit on it. 
Fluhr graduated with a dual degree in engineering and finance at the University of Pennsylvania. He won the Joseph Wharton Award for Young Leadership, presented by the Wharton Club of New York. After attending college he worked at the Blackstone Group in New York and then at Thomas Weisel Partners in San Francisco.

Career
While at Stanford Graduate School of Business, Fluhr entered the annual business plan competition with Eric Baker (later of Viagogo). Fluhr and Baker devised the idea of a website named "NeedATicket.com", where the public could buy and sell tickets for sporting events and concerts. The idea was so promising that Fluhr and Baker co-founded StubHub in March 2000 and then Fluhr dropped out of Stanford after his first year. Fluhr and Baker sought out investors in the music and sports industries and by August 2000 had raised $600,000 of seed capital for the new company.

In 2003, StubHub started running ads in Google. By 2006, StubHub had nearly 200 employees, had sold about $200 million worth of tickets, and had sponsorship agreements with 17 professional and college sports teams. Fluhr sold StubHub in 2007 to eBay for $310 million.

In late 2011, Fluhr launched Spreecast, a social video platform which brings people together for face-face conversation. Spreecast integrated with social networks such as Facebook and Twitter. The company closed their website on July 14, 2016.

Fluhr is a general partner of Craft. As an angel investor he has invested in technology companies since the 1990s, including Houzz, Twilio, Warby Parker and Zocdoc. 

Fluhr has been the recipient of several awards including the San Francisco Business Times Forty Under 40 list, Sports Business Journal 's Forty Under 40 list and Entrepreneur Magazine 's 24 Best and Brightest Young Entrepreneurs.

References

American business executives
American company founders
American investors
Wharton School of the University of Pennsylvania alumni
Living people
Year of birth missing (living people)